Erik Follestad Johansen (born June 22, 1989) is a former Norwegian professional ice hockey defenceman who has played for Vålerenga in Norway's GET-ligaen.

He is participating at the 2011 IIHF World Championship as a member of the Norway men's national ice hockey team.

External links

1989 births
Frisk Asker Ishockey players
Vålerenga Ishockey players
Living people
Norwegian ice hockey defencemen